Yardiella is a monotypic genus of Australian crevice weavers containing the single species, Yardiella humphreysi. It was first described by Michael R. Gray in 1994, and has only been found in Australia.

References

Filistatidae
Monotypic Araneomorphae genera
Spiders of Australia